In mathematics, the Milnor conjecture was a proposal by  of a description of the Milnor K-theory (mod 2) of a general field F with characteristic different from 2, by means of the Galois (or equivalently étale) cohomology of F with coefficients in Z/2Z.

Statement
Let F be a field of characteristic different from 2. Then there is an isomorphism

for all n ≥ 0, where KM denotes the Milnor ring.

About the proof
The proof of this theorem by Vladimir Voevodsky uses several ideas developed by Voevodsky, Alexander Merkurjev, Andrei Suslin, Markus Rost, Fabien Morel, Eric Friedlander, and others, including the newly minted theory of motivic cohomology (a kind of substitute for singular cohomology for algebraic varieties) and the motivic Steenrod algebra.

Generalizations
The analogue of this result for primes other than 2 was known as the Bloch–Kato conjecture.  Work of Voevodsky and Markus Rost yielded a complete proof of this conjecture in 2009; the result is now called the norm residue isomorphism theorem.

References

Further reading
 

K-theory
Conjectures that have been proved
Theorems in algebraic topology